Ignác (Yitzhaq Yehuda) Goldziher (22 June 1850 – 13 November 1921), often credited as Ignaz Goldziher, was a Hungarian scholar of Islam. Along with the German Theodor Nöldeke and the Dutch Christiaan Snouck Hurgronje, he is considered the founder of modern Islamic studies in Europe. Goldziher is also known for his foundational work of esoteric exegesis of the Hebrew Bible in the seminal work on the topic in "Mythology among the Hebrews," in which he defended Jewish mythology from accusations by the racists of the time that the Jews "stole" the myths of other peoples by explaining the similarities as a consequence of an origination in star lore and astral theology.

Biography
Born in Székesfehérvár of German Jewish heritage, he was educated at the universities of Budapest, Berlin, Leipzig and Leiden with the support of József Eötvös, Hungarian minister of culture. He became privatdozent at Budapest in 1872. In the next year, under the auspices of the Hungarian government, he began a journey through Syria, Palestine and Egypt, and took the opportunity of attending lectures of Muslim sheiks in the mosque of al-Azhar in Cairo.

Goldziher kept a personal record of his reflections, travel records and daily records. This journal was later published in his German mother tongue as Tagebuch. The following quotation from Goldziher's published journal provides insight into his feelings about Islam.

 (p. 59)

i.e., "In those weeks, I truly entered into the spirit of Islam to such an extent that ultimately I became inwardly convinced that I myself was a Muslim, and judiciously discovered that this was the only religion which, even in its doctrinal and official formulation, can satisfy philosophic minds. My ideal was to elevate Judaism to a similar rational level. Islam, as my experience taught me, is the only religion, in which superstitious and heathen ingredients are not frowned upon by rationalism, but by orthodox doctrine."

Sander Gilman, in commenting on this passage, writes that, 'the Islam he discovered becomes the model for a new spirit of Judaism at the close of the nineteenth century.’  In Cairo, Goldziher even prayed as a Muslim: "In the midst of the thousands of the pious, I rubbed my forehead against the floor of the mosque. Never in my life was I more devout, more truly devout, than on that exalted Friday."

Despite his love for Islam, Goldziher remained a devout Jew all his life. This bond to the Mosaic faith was unusual for a man seeking an academic career in Europe in the late 19th century.  This fact is significant in understanding his work. He saw Islam through the eyes of someone who refused to assimilate into contemporary European culture.  In fact, despite his fondness for Islam, he had little affection, if not outright scorn, for European Christianity.  As a convert to Christianity he would have easily received a university appointment as full professor but he refused.

Goldziher died in Budapest.

Career
In 1890 he published  in which he showed how Hadith reflected the legal and doctrinal controversies of the two centuries after the death of Muhammad rather than the words of Mohamed himself. He was a strong believer in the view that Islamic law owes its origins to Roman law but in the opinion of Patricia Crone his arguments here are "uncharacteristically weak".

Goldziher was denied a teaching post at Budapest University until he was 44. He represented the Hungarian government and the Academy of Sciences at numerous international congresses. He received the large gold medal at the Stockholm Oriental Congress in 1889. He became a member of several Hungarian and other learned societies, and was appointed secretary of the Jewish community in Budapest. He was made Litt.D. of Cambridge (1904) and LL.D. of Aberdeen (1906).

Views on Zionism

Goldziher viewed Zionism as an ethno-nationalist sentiment and a distinctly separate ideology from the religion of Judaism or what makes one a Jew, stating: “Jewishness is a religious term and not an ethnographical one. As regards to my nationality I am a Transdanubian, and by religion a Jew. When I headed for Hungary from Jerusalem I felt I was coming home.”

Works
A searchable database of all his works available in full length: Bibliographical database
 
Tagebuch, ed. Alexander Scheiber. Leiden: Brill, 1978. 
Zur Literaturgeschichte der Shi'a (1874)
Beiträge zur Geschichte der Sprachgelehrsamkeit bei den Arabern. Vienna, 1871–1873.
Der Mythos bei den Hebräern und seine geschichtliche Entwickelung. Leipzig, 1876; or, "Mythology among the Hebrews," Eng. trans., R Martineau, London, 1877.
Muhammedanische Studien. Halle, 1889–1890, 2 vols. 
 English translation: Muslim Studies, 2 vols. Albany, 1977.
Abhandlungen zur arabischen Philologie, 2 vols. Leiden, 1896–1899.
Buch vom Wesen der Seele. Berlin 1907.
Vorlesungen über den Islam. 1910; 2nd ed. revised by Franz Babinger, 1925.
 English translation: Introduction to Islamic Theology and Law, trans. Andras and Ruth Hamori. Princeton University Press, 1981.

Legacy

Islamic traditions
Goldziher's eminence in the sphere of scholarship was due primarily to his careful investigation of pre-Islamic and Islamic law, tradition, religion and poetry, in connection with which he published a large number of treatises, review articles and essays contributed to the collections of the Hungarian Academy. Scholarly work of his that is still considered relevant include his contention that Mecca, as the birthplace of Islam, is a myth.

Along with Joseph Schacht (1902-1969), who expanded on his work, Goldziher is thought to have authored one of the "two influential and founding works" of Islamic studies or "Orientalist" studies (Goldziher's being Muslim Studies) according to Mohammed Salem Al-Shehri.  
Writing in the late 19th and early 20th century, Goldziher "inaugurated the critical study" of the hadith's authenticity and concluded that "the great majority of traditions from the Prophet are documents not of the time to which they claim to belong" but created "during the first centuries of Islam," i.e. were fraudulent. This included hadith "accepted even in the most rigorously critical Muslim collections", which meant that "the meticulous isnads which supported them were utterly fictitious" (R. Stephen Humphreys). Instead, Goldziher argued in his book Muslim Studies, hadith were the product of "debates and arguments within the emerging [Islamic] religion and society ... projected back into the time of the Prophet" and were a means of putting "support for one party or another ... into the mouth of the prophet" (in the words of G.R. Hawting).

Comments of Edward Said
Goldziher's works have taken on a renewed importance in recent times owing to Edward Said's critical attacks in his book Orientalism.  Said himself was to reprove his work's defect for failing to pay sufficient attention to scholars like Goldziher.  Of five major German orientalists, he remarked that four of them, despite their profound erudition, were hostile to Islam. Goldziher's work was an exception in that he appreciated 'Islam's tolerance towards other religions', though this was undermined by his dislike of anthropomorphism in Mohammad's thought, and what Said calls 'Islam's too exterior theology and jurisprudence'. In his numerous books and articles, he sought to find the origins of Islamic doctrines and rituals in the practices of other cultures. In doing so, he posited that Islam continuously developed as a civilization, importing and exporting ideas.

See also
 Islamic scholars
 Josef Horovitz
 Joseph Schacht

References

Citations

Sources

External links
 
 A review of the book on Goldziher of the major contemporary scholar of his oeuvre, Róbert Simon: 

1850 births
1921 deaths
People from Székesfehérvár
Hungarian Jews
19th-century Hungarian people
20th-century Hungarian people
Historians of Islam
Hungarian orientalists
Jewish orientalists
Jewish scientists
Jewish scholars of Islam
Corresponding Fellows of the British Academy